Civitanova may refer to:

 Civitanova Marche, comune in the Province of Macerata in the Italian region Marche
 Civitanova del Sannio, comune in the Province of Isernia in the Italian region Molise
 Civitanova Marche Lighthouse, an active lighthouse located in front of the Port of Civitanova Marche, Marche on the Adriatic Sea